Royal Danish Yacht Club (shortened KDY) is a Danish yacht club in Copenhagen that was established 1866 under the name Dansk Forening for Lystsejlads. It is the oldest yacht club in Denmark, and has been under royal patronage since Christian IX's approval in 1891. It has about 2,200 members. The club house has been situated in Tuborg Havn since 2007.

History

The Royal Danish Yacht Club was originally based in the Langelinie Pavilion in Copenhagen. The building was destroyed by schalburgtage during World War II. The club has later moved to their new purpose-built headquarters in Tuborg Haven.

References

Royal yacht clubs